SIRCA may refer to:

 SIRCA, an Australian online service provider
 Silicone Impregnated Refractory Ceramic Ablator